Ivar Kolve (born 31 March 1967) is a Norwegian jazz musician (xylophone, vibraphone, marimba and percussion), the younger brother of the saxophonist Kåre Kolve, and known from several album releases as soloartist and for collaborations with Maria Joao, Jan Gunnar Hoff, Ståle Storløkken, Mathias Eick, Eivind Aarset and Bjørn Kjellemyr among others.

Career 
Kolve was born in Voss but since 1988 has lived in Bergen, where he was educated at the Bergen Musikkonservatorium.
With his own Trio Ivar Kolve Trio (established in 1996) Sébastien Dubé (bass) and Stein Inge Brækhus (drums), he has released a number of albums.

Kolve is part of the band «Spindel» led by Liv Merete Kroken and Sigrid Moldestad (Spindel 2001 and Aminje 2005). He has also participated in a number of projects like with the Voss Children's Choir «Småkvedarne» (Småkvedarne, NorCD),
and with Jan Gunnar Hoff Free flow songs, commissioned work for Vossajazz in 2005.

At Vossajazz 2014, he appeared with an Polyostinat experience. Here he performed with an elite team of Norwegian musicians, Kåre Kolve, Jørn Øien, Ellen Andrea Wang and last but not the least Jarle Vespestad. They delivered an indulgent poly rhythmic and poly harmonic treat for the discerning ear.

Honors 
2000: Vossajazzprisen

Discography 

Solo albums
1998: Ope (NorCD)
2005: Innover (Curling Legs)
2008: View From My Room (Curling Legs)

With «Spindel»
2001: Spindel (Heilo/Grappa)
2005: Aminje (Heilo/Grappa)

With Trond-Viggo Torgersen
2005: Barnetimen For De Store (EMI)

With Terje Rypdal
2005: Lux Aeterna (ECM)

With Bergen Big Band, feat. Karin Krog, directed by John Surman
2005: Seagull (Grappa)

With Lothe
2012:  Blå Song (Grammofon)

With Karin Krog & John Surman
2013: Songs About This And That (Meantime), including with Bjørn Klakegg, Terje Gewelt & Tom Olstad

References

External links 

Norwegian jazz vibraphonists
Norwegian jazz drummers
Male drummers
Norwegian percussionists
Norwegian composers
Norwegian male composers
Avant-garde jazz musicians
Musicians from Voss
Musicians from Bergen
1967 births
Living people
20th-century drummers
21st-century Norwegian drummers
20th-century Norwegian male musicians
21st-century Norwegian male musicians
Male jazz musicians
Curling Legs artists
NorCD artists
Grappa Music artists
ECM Records artists